WIPR-FM (91.3 FM), branded on-air as Allegro 91.3, is a radio station broadcasting a classical format, but the station also broadcasts some NPR programs. Licensed to San Juan, Puerto Rico, the station is currently owned by la Corporación de Puerto Rico para la Difusión Pública.

See also
 WIPR-TV
 WIPR (AM)

External links

List of "grandfathered" FM radio stations in the U.S.

IPR-FM
Classical music radio stations in the United States
Radio stations established in 1960
1960 establishments in Puerto Rico
NPR member stations
Public broadcasting in Puerto Rico